Bann may refer to:

Banns of marriage
River Bann, in Northern Ireland
Bann Rowing Club, Coleraine, Northern Ireland
River Bann, in Wexford, Ireland
Bann, Germany, a municipality in Rhineland-Palatinate, Germany

People
 Bill Bann (1902–1973), Scottish footballer
 Blair Bann (born 1988), Canadian volleyball player
 Stephen Bann (born 1942), British art historian

See also 
Ban (disambiguation)